Ivan Yuryevich Moskvitin (? – after 1647) was a Russian explorer, presumably a native of Moscow, who led a Russian reconnaissance party to the Sea of Okhotsk, becoming the first Russian to reach the Pacific Ocean.

Moskvitin is first attested in 1626 as residing among the Cossacks in Tomsk. In 1636 or 1637 Dmitry Kopylov with 54 men including Moskvitin were sent east toward Yakutsk. He went down the Lena River and up the Aldan River and on 28 June 1638 founded the fort of Butalsk about 100 km above the mouth of the Maya River and about 250 km southeast of Yakutsk. From a local Shaman Kopylov learned of a south-flowing "River Shirkol" (Zeya River?) where sedentary people grew grain and had cattle and, according to some sources, a silver deposit. In May 1639 he sent Moskvitin with 20 Tomsk Cossacks and 19 Krasnoyarsk Cossacks and an Evenk guide eastward. They went down the Aldan River and up the Maya River and from the upper Maya crossed the Dzhugdzhur Mountains and went down the Ulya River and in August 1639 reached the Sea of Okhotsk.

At the river mouth, or 25 km above its mouth, they built winter quarters. On the first of October he and 20 men sailed east for three days and reached the Okhota River where the town of Okhotsk was later built. Then they either sailed 500 km further east to the Taui River, or they learned enough from the natives to make a map of the coast as far as the Taui River (sources differ).  That winter they built two large boats. There was some fighting with the local Lamuts and they captured a man to use as a guide and interpreter. The captive told him of a "River Mamur" at whose mouth lived the "sedentary Gilyaks". In late April or early May 1640 he sailed southwest as far as Uda Gulf at the southwest corner of the Sea of Okhotsk. There they learned of the Amur River, the Zeya River and the Amgun River and of the "sedentary Gilyaks" on the coasts and islands and the "bearded Daurs" who had big houses, cattle and horses, ate bread and lived like Russians. They also heard that the bearded Daurs had recently come in boats and killed many Gilyaks. They then headed east, sighted the Shantar Islands and entered the Sakhalin Gulf.  They may have seen the west coast of Sakhalin Island and seem to have reached some islands of the sedentary Gilyaks which may have been at the mouth of the Amur River. Because of the late season, they turned back and in November built winter quarters at the mouth of the Aldoma River which is 30 miles northeast of Ayan. By the middle of July 1641 they were back at Yakutsk.

Information he provided enabled Kurbat Ivanov to make the first map of the coast (March 1642). In 1645 he and Kopylov proposed to the Tomsk voyevod Shcherbatsky a large military expedition to the Amur. The proposal was not acted upon. He was sent to Moscow in 1646 and returned to Tomsk in 1647 with the rank of ataman. The remainder of his life is undocumented.

References
George V Lantzeff and Richard A Pierce, "Eastward to Empire",1973
 Москвитин Иван Юрьевич // hrono.ru
 for accuracy problems see the talk page.

Year of birth unknown
17th-century deaths
Russian explorers
Explorers of Siberia
Explorers of Asia
Russian Cossacks
Year of death unknown
17th-century explorers
17th-century Russian people
Tsardom of Russia people